Georg Mattli (October 18, 1954 - August 26, 1991) was a former Swiss professional ice hockey left winger who played for EHC Arosa in the National League A. He also represented the Swiss national team at the 1976 Winter Olympics.

References

External links

1954 births
1991 deaths
Ice hockey players at the 1976 Winter Olympics
Olympic ice hockey players of Switzerland
Swiss ice hockey left wingers
EHC Arosa players
EHC Kloten players